Luis De Faría (born 21 February 1996) is an Argentine professional footballer who plays as a midfielder for Unión Alicia.

Career
De Faría's first club were Godoy Cruz, he started his youth career with them at the age of six prior to starting his senior career in 2015 with the club. His debut appearance came on 30 May in a 1–0 defeat to Unión Santa Fe, which was the first of five to come during the 2015 Primera División campaign. In February 2016, De Faría was loaned to Gimnasia y Esgrima of Torneo Federal A. He went on to feature six times, two of which were starts, for Gimnasia y Esgrima in 2016. De Faría left Godoy in December 2018 after his contract ended, going on to join Liga San Francisco team Unión Alicia in early 2020.

Career statistics
.

References

External links

1996 births
Living people
Sportspeople from Mendoza, Argentina
Argentine footballers
Association football midfielders
Argentine Primera División players
Torneo Federal A players
Godoy Cruz Antonio Tomba footballers
Gimnasia y Esgrima de Mendoza footballers